George B. Treadway (November 11, 1866 – November 5, 1928) was an American baseball player in the National League from 1893 to 1896. He played for the Baltimore Orioles for one season, the Brooklyn Grooms for two seasons, and finished off his career with two games for the Louisville Colonels. He was a lifetime .285 hitter, with 13 home runs and 227 runs batted in. He did have a solid year in 1894 with Baltimore, batting .330, hitting 26 triples, and driving in 102 runs.

External links

1866 births
1928 deaths
19th-century baseball players
Major League Baseball outfielders
Baltimore Orioles (NL) players
Brooklyn Grooms players
Louisville Colonels players
Bloomington Reds players
Davenport Onion Weeders players
Denver Grizzlies (baseball) players
Denver Mountaineers players
St. Paul Apostles players
Minneapolis Millers (baseball) players
Los Angeles Seraphs players
Syracuse Stars (minor league baseball) players
Grand Rapids Bob-o-links players
Butte Miners players
Seattle Clamdiggers players
Tacoma Tigers players
Seattle Chinooks players
Portland Browns players
Baseball players from Kentucky
People from Greenup County, Kentucky